Mela Uzhavoor (Known as "Mela Ulur") is a village in Thanjavur district,  Tamil Nadu, India

Villages in Thanjavur district

Thanjavur distric 
Orathanadu thaluka
Melaulur
Pin-614904
தஞ்சாவூர் மாவட்டம் 
ஒரத்தநாடு தாலுக்கா 
மேலஉளூர்.... 
அஞ்சல் 614904. 18 கிராமம் அடங்கிய கீழ்வேங்கைநாடு  எனும் நாட்டு கட்டமைப்பில் தலைமை கிராமமாக விளங்குகிறது..மேலஉளூர்.... இவூரில் மக்களுக்கான அடிப்படை வசதிகள் அணைத்தும் கிடைக்கின்றன. அரசு மருத்துவமனை,தனியார் மருத்துவ கிளீனிக்,  அரசுபள்ளி, தனியார் பள்ளி  அணைத்து ஊறுகளுக்கும் பேருந்து வசதி, மருத்துவ பொருள்கள்,

மளிகைபொருள்களஎன அணைத்தும் கிடைக்கும் இடமாக இருக்கின்றது. ்